Paremonia argentata is a moth of the subfamily Arctiinae. It was described by George Hampson in 1914. It is found in Ghana and Kenya.

References

Lithosiini
Moths described in 1914